Orontobia mooseri is a moth of the family Erebidae. It was described by Josef J. de Freina in 1997. It is found in Tibet.

References

Arctiina
Moths described in 1997